Kile is a TeX/LaTeX editor to edit TeX/LaTeX source code. It runs on Unix-like systems including Mac OS X and Linux, as well as Microsoft Windows via the KDE on Windows initiative, with the Qt and KDE libraries installed.

Name and Pronunciation 
Kile means tickle or wedge in Norwegian, the native language of some of the Qt developers. As such, its proper pronunciation is  /kiːlə/ and not /kaɪl/.

Features 
Kile has many useful features needed to edit TeX/LaTeX source code, such as: 
One-click document compilation and display
Auto-completion of (La)TeX commands
Graphical lists of symbols for easy insertion
Templates and wizards for new document creation
Integration with the BibTeX bibliography manager

See also

 List of text editors
 Comparison of text editors
 Comparison of TeX editors

References

External links

 

Extragear
Free TeX editors
KDE Applications
Linux TeX software
TeX editors
TeX editors that use Qt
TeX SourceForge projects